The Cobra BMT-2 is an Iranian Infantry fighting vehicle armed with a 30 mm autocannon or a ZU-23-2 anti-aircraft gun.

History
The Cobra began field testing with the Iranian Military in May 1996. In July 1997, Iranian President Hashemi Rafsanjani of Iran formally opened a production line that would produce the BMT-2 as well as the Zulfiqar main battle tank and Boragh tracked armored personnel carriers.

Operators
 Iran

References

See also
Military of Iran
Iranian military industry
Equipment of the Iranian army

Armoured fighting vehicles of Iran
Wheeled armoured personnel carriers
Military vehicles introduced in the 1990s